Sorrus is a commune in the Pas-de-Calais department in the Hauts-de-France region of France.

Geography
Sorrus lies 2 miles (3 km) west of Montreuil-sur-Mer at the junction of the D144 and the D145 roads.

Population

Places of interest
 The church of St.Riqiuer, dating from the sixteenth century
 Traces of the 16th century Château-Bleu.
 The nineteenth century Château de la Bruyère.

See also
Communes of the Pas-de-Calais department

References

Communes of Pas-de-Calais